Marlo Koponen is a Finnish ice hockey defenceman who currently plays professionally in Finland for SaiPa of the SM-liiga.

References

External links

Living people
SaiPa players
Finnish ice hockey defencemen
1986 births
People from Imatra
Sportspeople from South Karelia